Charlyne Amanda Yi (born January 4, 1986) is an American actor, comedian, musician, and writer. Their performances include music, magic, games, and often audience participation.

Their screenwriting debut, the feature film Paper Heart, won the Waldo Salt Screenwriting Award at the 2009 Sundance Film Festival. They are also known for their role as Dr. Chi Park on the Fox medical drama House, the voice of Ruby on the Cartoon Network animated series Steven Universe (2013–2019), and its epilogue series Steven Universe Future, the voice of Chloe Park on We Bare Bears (2014–2019), the voice of Alice on Summer Camp Island (2018–present), and the voice of Mai in Next Gen (2018).

Early life 
Yi was raised in Fontana, California; their mother has Filipino and Spanish ancestry and their father is of Korean, Irish, Mexican, German, French and Native American descent. They attended the University of California, Riverside before leaving to pursue a full-time career in comedy. They had an early interest in performing while attending Bloomington High School and were involved in theatre.

Career 

Yi began their career by performing in Bloomington, California. After high school, they performed shows in Los Angeles at The Steve Allen Theater, and The Upright Citizens Brigade Theatre. In 2005 and 2006 they performed in the New York Comedy Festival, and in 2007 HBO's U.S. Comedy Arts Festival in Aspen, Colorado.

Yi's film debut was in Judd Apatow's 2007 film Knocked Up. In 2008, Yi performed as part of the Apatow for Destruction Live comedy show at Montreal's Just for Laughs Festival.

In the 2009 film Paper Heart, a "hybrid documentary" in which Yi served as both executive producer and co-writer, Yi starred as a fictional version of themself, alongside Michael Cera.

Yi was chosen as one of Venus Zines "25 under 25" women for 2009.

They appeared alongside Saturday Night Live cast member Fred Armisen in the 2009 music video for the song "Rabbit Habits" by Philadelphia experimental band Man Man.

Yi and Paul Rust formed the band The Glass Beef. The duo share one electric guitar and both sing lead vocals. In 2006, they released their debut album, The Farewell Album, produced by John Spiker, bassist of Tenacious D.

Yi was featured in the video "Song Away" by Hockey. They are currently in the band Sacred Destinies.

From October 2011 to May 2012, Yi starred in the Fox television series House as Dr. Chi Park, a young doctor with anger management issues.

Non-profit work 
Yi has been involved with Oxfam America since 2010, working to raise awareness about poverty and hunger around the world. Yi started the non-profit Caring is Cool in 2011, and hosted a benefit show to raise money for the organization.

Personal life
Yi describes their gender identity as "queer genderfluid enby". They use they/them pronouns.

On Twitter, Yi accused Marilyn Manson of sexual harassment on the set of House.

In 2018 Amber Tamblyn said of her husband David Cross, "Basically he was rightfully accused of doing something racist to the comedian Charlyne Yi," following tweets that Yi had posted on the subject in 2017.

In 2021, they spoke out about their experience with James Franco, specifically discussing their efforts to quit his 2017 film, The Disaster Artist, after learning of the sexual misconduct allegations against him. Yi also criticized Seth Rogen for enabling Franco's behavior and continuing to work with him following the allegations.

Filmography

Film

Television

Books

References

External links 
 
 June 2009 Interview with L.A. Record

1986 births
Living people
21st-century American actors
21st-century American comedians
21st-century American screenwriters
21st-century American LGBT people
Actors from Los Angeles County, California
American actors of Filipino descent
American actors of Korean descent
American actors of Mexican descent
American comedians of Asian descent
American comedy musicians
American film actors
American musicians of Filipino descent
American musicians of Korean descent
American musicians of Mexican descent
American non-binary actors
American people of French descent
American people of German descent
American people of Irish descent
American people of Spanish descent
American people who self-identify as being of Native American descent
American performance artists
American stand-up comedians
American television actors
American voice actors
American LGBT people of Asian descent
LGBT people from California
Non-binary comedians
Non-binary musicians
Non-binary writers
People from Fontana, California
University of California, Riverside alumni
Upright Citizens Brigade Theater performers
Genderfluid people
American LGBT comedians